Oğuz Ceylan (born 15 December 1990) is a Turkish footballer who plays as a right back for TFF First League club Çaykur Rizespor.

Professional career
Ceylan is a product of the youth academies of Kepezspor, Dardanelspor and Beşiktaş. He started his professional career with successive loans to Siirtspor and Rizespor. He left Beşiktaş in 2012, and had stints with semi-pro clubs Maraşspor, BAKspor, Kartalspor and Ümraniyespor from 2012 to 2019. Ceylan made his professional debut with Gazişehir Gaziantep in a 4–1 Süper Lig win over Gençlerbirliği on 26 August 2019. On 1 July 2019, he transferred to Gaziantep in the TFF First League, signing a 1.5 year initial contract. The team achieved promotion to the Süper Lig for the 2020-21 season, and Ceylan extended his contract with Gaziantep for 3 years. On 4 July 2022, he transferred to MKE Ankaragücü signing a 2-year contract.

References

External links
 
 
 Mackolik Profile

1990 births
Living people
Sportspeople from Çanakkale
Turkish footballers
Gaziantep F.K. footballers
Kartalspor footballers
Beşiktaş J.K. footballers
Çaykur Rizespor footballers
Siirtspor footballers
MKE Ankaragücü footballers
Süper Lig players
TFF First League players
Association football fullbacks
Ümraniyespor footballers